Austin Ikenna Uzoremeke (born 15 August 1993) is a Nigerian footballer who plays as a forward.

Career
After terminating his contract with Tunisian side CA Bizertin, Ikenna signed for Kenyan side A.F.C. Leopards on a two-year contract in January 2014.
Ikenna went on trial with Aalesunds FK in July 2015, after being recommended to the club by André Schei Lindbæk, but failed to secure a deal. In August of the same year, Ikenna signed for IK Start until 2017.

In February 2017, Ikenna's contract with IK Start was terminated by mutual consent.

Career statistics

Club

References

1993 births
Living people
Nigerian footballers
Association football forwards
CA Bizertin players
A.F.C. Leopards players
IK Start players
FC Wels players
Eliteserien players
Austrian Regionalliga players
Nigerian expatriate footballers
Expatriate footballers in Tunisia
Expatriate footballers in Kenya
Expatriate footballers in Norway
Expatriate footballers in Austria
Nigerian expatriate sportspeople in Tunisia
Nigerian expatriate sportspeople in Norway
Nigerian expatriate sportspeople in Austria